Clandestine chemistry is chemistry carried out in secret, and particularly in illegal drug laboratories. Larger labs are usually run by gangs or organized crime intending to produce for distribution on the black market. Smaller labs can be run by individual chemists working clandestinely in order to synthesize smaller amounts of controlled substances or simply out of a hobbyist interest in chemistry, often because of the difficulty in ascertaining the purity of other, illegally synthesized drugs obtained on the black market. The term clandestine lab is generally used in any situation involving the production of illicit compounds, regardless of whether the facilities being used qualify as a true laboratory.

History
Ancient forms of clandestine chemistry included the manufacturing of explosives.

Another old form of clandestine chemistry is the illegal brewing and distillation of alcohol. This is frequently done to avoid taxation on spirits.

From 1919 to 1933, the United States prohibited the sale, manufacture, or transportation of alcoholic beverages. This opened a door for brewers to supply their own town with alcohol. Just like modern-day drug labs, distilleries were placed in rural areas. The term moonshine generally referred to "corn whiskey", that is, a whiskey-like liquor made from corn. Today, American-made corn whiskey can be labeled or sold under that name, or as Bourbon or Tennessee whiskey, depending on the details of the production process.

Psychoactive substances

Precursor chemicals
Prepared substances (as opposed to those that occur naturally in a consumable form, such as cannabis and psilocybin mushrooms) require reagents. Some drugs, like cocaine and morphine, are extracted from plant sources and refined with the aid of chemicals. Semi-synthetic drugs such as heroin are made starting from alkaloids extracted from plant sources which are the precursors for further synthesis. In the case of heroin, a mixture of alkaloids is extracted from the opium poppy (Papaver somniferum) by incising its seed capsule, whereupon a milky fluid (the opium 'latex') bleeds out of the incisions which is then left to dry out and scraped off the bulbs, yielding raw opium. Morphine, one of many alkaloids in opium, is then extracted out of the opium by acid-base extraction and turned into heroin by reacting it with acetic anhydride. Other drugs (such as methamphetamine and MDMA) are normally made from commercially available chemicals, though both can also be made from naturally occurring precursors. Methamphetamine can also be made from ephedrine, one of the naturally occurring alkaloids in ephedra (Ephedra sinica). MDMA can be made from safrole, the major constituent of several etheric oils like sassafras. Governments have adopted a strategy of chemical control as part of their overall drug control and enforcement plans. Chemical control offers a means of attacking illicit drug production and disrupting the process before the drugs have entered the market.

Because many legitimate industrial chemicals such as anhydrous ammonia and iodine are also necessary in the processing and synthesis of most illicitly produced drugs, preventing the diversion of these chemicals from legitimate commerce to illicit drug manufacturing is a difficult job. Governments often place restrictions on the purchase of large quantities of chemicals that can be used in the production of illicit drugs, usually requiring licenses or permits to ensure that the purchaser has a legitimate need for them.

Suppliers of precursor chemicals
Chemicals critical to the production of cocaine, heroin, and synthetic drugs are produced in many countries throughout the world. Many manufacturers and suppliers exist in Europe, China, India, the United States, and a host of other countries.

Historically, chemicals critical to the synthesis or manufacture of illicit drugs are introduced into various venues via legitimate purchases by companies that are registered and licensed to do business as chemical importers or handlers. Once in a country or state, the chemicals are diverted by rogue importers or chemical companies, by criminal organizations and individual violators, or acquired as a result of coercion and/or theft on the part of drug traffickers. In response to stricter international controls, drug traffickers have increasingly been forced to divert chemicals by mislabeling the containers, forging documents, establishing front companies, using circuitous routing, hijacking shipments, bribing officials, or smuggling products across international borders.

Enforcement of controls on precursor chemicals

General
The Multilateral Chemical Reporting Initiative encourages governments to exchange information on a voluntary basis in order to monitor international chemical shipments. Over the past decade, key international bodies like the Commission on Narcotic Drugs and the U.N. General Assembly's Special Session (UNGASS) have addressed the issue of chemical diversion in conjunction with U.S. efforts. These organizations raised specific concerns about potassium permanganate and acetic anhydride.

To facilitate the international flow of information about precursor chemicals, the United States, through its relationship with the Inter-American Drug Control Abuse Commission (CICAD), continues to evaluate the use of precursor chemicals and assist countries in strengthening controls. Many nations still lack the capacity to determine whether the import or export of precursor chemicals is related to legitimate needs or illicit drugs. The problem is complicated by the fact that many chemical shipments are either brokered or transshipped through third countries in an attempt to disguise their purpose or destination.

Beginning in July 2001, the International Narcotics Control Board (INCB) has opted to organize an international conference with the goal of devising a specific action plan to counter the traffic in MDMA precursor chemicals. They hope to prevent the diversion of chemicals used in the production of amphetamine-type stimulants (ATS), including MDMA (ecstasy) and methamphetamine.

In June 2015, the European Commission approved Regulation (EU) 2015/1013 which outlined for the monitoring of drug precursors traded between the Union and third countries. The Regulation also establishes uniform procedures for licensing and registration of operators and users who are listed in a European database tracking drug precursors.

Despite this long history of law enforcement actions, restrictions of chemicals, and even covert military actions, many illicit drugs are still widely available all over the world.

Cocaine
Operation Purple is a U.S. DEA driven international chemical control initiative designed to reduce the illicit manufacture of cocaine in the Andean Region, identifying rogue firms and suspect individuals; gathering intelligence on diversion methods, trafficking trends, and shipping routes; and taking administrative, civil and/or criminal action as appropriate. Critical to the success of this operation is the communication network that gives notification of shipments and provides the government of the importer sufficient time to verify the legitimacy of the transaction and take appropriate action. The effects of this initiative have been dramatic and far-reaching. Operation Purple has exposed a significant vulnerability among traffickers, and has grown to include almost thirty nations. According to the DEA, Operation Purple has been highly effective at interfering with cocaine production. However, illicit chemists always find new methods to evade the DEA's scrutiny.

In countries where strict chemical controls have been put in place, illicit drug production has been seriously affected. For example, few of the chemicals needed to process coca leaf into cocaine are manufactured in Bolivia or Peru. Most are smuggled in from neighbouring countries with advanced chemical industries or diverted from a smaller number of licit handlers. Increased interdiction of chemicals in Peru and Bolivia has contributed to final product cocaine from those countries being of lower, minimally oxidized quality.

As a result, Bolivian lab operators are now using inferior substitutes such as cement instead of lime and sodium bicarbonate instead of ammonia and recycled solvents like ether. Some non-solvent fuels such as gasoline, kerosene and diesel fuel are even used in place of solvents. 
Manufacturers are attempting to streamline a production process that virtually eliminates oxidation to produce cocaine base. Some laboratories are not using sulfuric acid during the maceration state; consequently, less cocaine alkaloid is extracted from the leaf, producing less cocaine hydrochloride, the powdered cocaine marketed for overseas consumption.

Heroin
Similarly, heroin-producing countries depend on supplies of acetic anhydride (AA) from the international market. This heroin precursor continues to account for the largest volume of internationally seized chemicals, according to the International Narcotics Control Board. Since July 1999, there have been several notable seizures of acetic anhydride in Turkey (amounting to nearly seventeen metric tons) and Turkmenistan (totaling seventy-three metric tons).

Acetic anhydride, the most commonly used chemical agent in heroin processing, is virtually irreplaceable. According to the DEA, Mexico remains the only heroin source route to heroin laboratories in Afghanistan. Authorities in Uzbekistan, Turkmenistan, Kyrgyzstan, and Kazakhstan routinely seize ton-quantity shipments of diverted acetic anhydride.

The lack of acetic anhydride has caused clandestine chemists in some countries to substitute it for lower quality precursors such as acetic acid and results in the formation of impure black tar heroin that contains a mixture of drugs not found in heroin made with pure chemicals.

DEA's Operation Topaz is a coordinated international strategy targeting acetic anhydride. In place since March 2001, a total of thirty-one countries are currently organized participants in the program in addition to regional participants. The DEA reports that as of June 2001, some 125 consignments of acetic anhydride had been tracked totaling 618,902,223 kilograms. As of July 2001, there has been approximately 20 shipments of AA totaling 185,000 kilograms either stopped or seized.

Amphetamines

The practice of clandestine chemistry to synthesize controlled substance analogues and circumvent drug laws was first noticed in the late 1960s, as types of drugs became controlled substances in many countries. With the Title 21 United States Code (USC) Controlled Substances Act (CSA) of October 27, 1970 amphetamines became controlled substances in the United States. Prior to this, amphetamine sulfate first became widely available as an over-the-counter (OTC) nasal decongestant inhaler in 1933, marketed by SKF under the brand name Benzedrine. Shortly afterward, physicians began documenting amphetamine's general stimulant properties and subsequently its potential for treating narcolepsy, which prompted SKF in 1938 to begin also manufacturing amphetamine sulfate as tablets. Initially, the frequency of amphetamine use was negligible; however, by 1959 its popularity as a therapeutic agent and also an illicit drug had skyrocketed nationwide, causing the Federal Bureau of Narcotics (FBN) to reclassify amphetamine from OTC to prescription-only.

As of the early 1990s, methamphetamine use was concentrated among young white males in California and nearby states. Since then its use has spread both demographically and geographically.  Methamphetamine has been a favorite among various populations including motorcycle gangs, truckers, laborers, soldiers, and ravers. Known as a "club drug", the National Institute on Drug Abuse tracks its incidence of use in children as young as twelve, and the prevalence of users increases with age.

In the 1980s and early 1990s, most methamphetamine production in the United States occurred in small independent laboratories. Phenylacetone, one precursor of methamphetamine, became a Schedule II controlled immediate precursor in 1979.  Underground chemists searched for alternative methods for producing methamphetamine. The two predominant methods which appeared both involve the reduction of ephedrine or pseudoephedrine to methamphetamine. At the time, neither was a watched chemical, and pills containing the substance could be bought by the thousands without raising any kind of suspicion.

In the 1990s, the DEA recognized that legally imported precursors were being diverted to the production of methamphetamine.  Changes to federal regulations in 1988 and throughout the 1990s enabled the DEA to more closely track the  ephedrine and pseudoephedrine precursors. Many individual States have enacted precursor control laws which limit the sale of over-the-counter cold medications which contain ephedrine or pseudoephedrine. This made it somewhat more difficult for underground chemists to produce methamphetamine.  In May 1995, the DEA shut down two major suppliers of precursors in the United States, seizing 25 metric tons of ephedrine and pseudoephedrine from Clifton Pharmaceuticals and 500 cases of pseudoephedrine from X-Pressive Looks, Inc. (XLI).  The immediate market impact suggests that they had been providing more than 50 percent of the precursors used nationally to produce methamphetamine. However, the market rapidly rebounded.

The methamphetamine situation also changed in the mid-1990s as Mexican organized crime became a major player in its production and distribution, operating "super-labs" which produced a substantial percentage of the drugs being sold. According to the DEA, the seizure of 3.5 metric tons of pseudoephedrine in Texas in 1994 revealed that Mexican trafficking groups were producing methamphetamine on an unprecedented scale. More recent reports indicate an ongoing presence of Mexican trafficking.

Although the prevalence of domestic meth labs continues to be high in western states, they have spread throughout the United States. It has been suggested that "do-it-yourself" meth production in rural areas is reflective of a broader DIY approach that includes activities such as hunting, fishing, and fixing one’s cars, trucks, equipment, and house. Toxic chemicals resulting from methamphetamine production may be hoarded or clandestinely dumped, damaging land, water, plant life and wild life, and posing a risk to humans.  Waste from methamphetamine labs is frequently dumped on federal, public, and tribal lands. The chemicals involved can explode and clandestine chemistry has been implicated in both house and wild land fires.

In Oregon, Brett Sherry of the Oregon Clandestine Drug Lab Cleanup Program has been quoted as stating that only 10–20% of drug labs are discovered by police.
Statistics reporting the prevalence of meth labs and arrest of meth producers can vary greatly from county to county and state to state. Factors affecting policing and reporting include funding, specialized training, support from local residents, willingness to make the issue a priority in policing. How information is categorized and tracked may also inflate or minimize the apparent results. Missouri, which has tended to report some of the highest numbers of meth-lab arrests in the country, has pursued an aggressive and highly publicized policing policy, resulting in as many as 205 cases a year in one county. In contrast, West Virginia tends to report and prosecute very few cases, possibly because there the agency that reports a meth lab is held responsible for paying for its cleanup. Cleanup of toxic and hazardous materials at a single site may cost tens of thousands of dollars. This is a disincentive for agencies with limited budgets. Michigan reported an increase in incidents in 2016, following the formation of the Midland County Methamphetamine Protocol Team in 2015. Many of the cases reported involved meth users who were making small amounts of the drug in a simple "one-pot method" for both personal use and sale to others.

DEA El Paso Intelligence Center data is showing a downward trend in the number of clandestine drug labs seized for the illicit manufacture of methamphetamine down from a high of 15,196 in 2010. Drug seizure quantities, on the other hand, are steadily increasing since 2007, according to data from the DEA's System to Retrieve Information from Drug Evidence (STRIDE) (see table to the right).

Cleanup
Clean up processes were regulated by the EPA as of 2007. The Methamphetamine Remediation Research Act of 2007 required EPA to develop guidelines for remediation of former methamphetamine labs. This creates guidelines for States and local agencies to improve "our national understanding of identifying the point at which former methamphetamine laboratories become clean enough to inhabit again." The legislation also required that EPA periodically update the guidelines, as appropriate, to reflect the best available knowledge and research.
 		
Making a former meth lab site safer for habitation requires two basic efforts:
 		
 Gross chemical removal: This is the process in which law enforcement or a Drug Enforcement Administration contractors removes the obvious dangers from the site. Obvious dangers include containers of chemicals, equipment, and apparatus that could be used to make illegal drugs, drug paraphernalia, and other illegal items. This process does not cleanup or remove chemical spills, stains or residue that could be harmful to inhabitants. A property that has had only a gross chemical removal is not fit for habitation. 
 		
 Clandestine remediation: The cleaning of interior structures and, if applicable, the surrounding land, surface waters and groundwater by an EPA approved or National Crime Scene Cleanup Association certified company. This is the process of removing the residue and waste from the site after the gross chemical removal is done. A property that has been remediated should present minimal to no health risk to occupants.

Contamination

Alcoholic drinks
Alcoholic drinks that are known to be contaminated.

 Diethylene glycol, used dangerously by some winemakers in sweet wines

Moonshine
 Moonshine from various countries:
 Changaa (Kenya)
 Guaro (Latin America)
 Jamaica ginger (United States)
 Kumi Kumi (Kenya)
 Lotoko (Democratic Republic of the Congo)
 Tharra (Indian subcontinent)

Black tar heroin
Black tar heroin is a free base form of heroin that is sticky like tar or hard like coal. Its dark color is the result of crude processing methods that leave behind impurities.

Black tar as a type holds a variable admixture morphine derivatives—predominantly 6-MAM (6-monoacetylmorphine) which is another result of crude acetylation. The lack of proper reflux during acetylation fails to remove much of the moisture retained in the acetylating agent, glacial acetic acid.

Cocaine paste

Oxi
Oxi (abbr. from Portuguese oxidado) is a stimulant drug based on cocaine paste originally developed in the Brazilian Amazon forest region. It is reportedly a mixture of cocaine paste, gasoline, kerosene and quicklime (calcium oxide).

Krokodil
Illicitly produced desomorphine is typically far from pure and often contains large amounts of toxic substances and contaminants as a result of being "cooked" and used without any significant effort to remove the byproducts and leftovers from synthesis. Injecting any such mixture can cause serious damage to the skin, blood vessels, bone and muscles, sometimes requiring limb amputation in long-term users. Its melting point is 189 °C.

Causes of this damage are from iodine, phosphorus and other toxic substances that are present after synthesis.

Methamphetamine

A common adulterant is dimethyl sulfone, a solvent and cosmetic base without known effect on the nervous system; other adulterants include dimethylamphetamine HCl, ephedrine HCl, sodium thiosulfate, sodium chloride, sodium glutamate, and a mixture of caffeine with sodium benzoate.

MPPP
MPTP may be accidentally produced during the manufacture of MPPP. 1-Methyl-4-phenylpyridinium (MPP+), a metabolite of MPTP, causes rapid onset of irreversible symptoms similar to Parkinson's disease.

PCP
Embalming fluid has been found as a by-product of PCP manufacture. Marijuana cigarettes dipped in embalming fluid, sometimes also laced with PCP are known as fry or fry sticks.

Explosives
Clandestine chemistry is not limited to drugs; it is also associated with explosives, and other illegal chemicals. Of the explosives manufactured illegally, nitroglycerin and acetone peroxide are easiest to produce due to the ease with which the precursors can be acquired.

Uncle Fester is a writer who commonly writes about different aspects of clandestine chemistry. Secrets of Methamphetamine Manufacture is among his most popular books, and is considered required reading for DEA agents. More of his books deal with other aspects of clandestine chemistry, including explosives, and poisons. Fester is, however, considered by many to be a faulty and unreliable source for information in regard to the clandestine manufacture of chemicals.

See also

 The Hive (website)
 Owsley Stanley
 William Leonard Pickard
 Nicholas Sand
 Casey William Hardison
 Uncle Fester (author)
 Rolling meth lab
 Cold water extraction
 DEA list of chemicals
 Breaking Bad

Notes

External links
 Clandestine labs FAQ at Erowid
 New 'shake-and-bake' method for making crystal meth gets around drug laws but is no less dangerous

Chemistry
Illegal drug trade
Science and law
Adulteration